Ross "Satchel" Davis (July 28, 1918 – January 1, 2013) was an American baseball pitcher in the Negro leagues. He played with the Baltimore Elite Giants in 1940, and with the Cleveland Buckeyes in 1943 and 1947. In 1940, he and Willie Hubert tossed a combined no-hitter for Baltimore against the Newark Eagles. Davis served in the United States Armed Forces during World War II.

References

External links
 and Seamheads
Negro League Baseball Players Association page

1918 births
2013 deaths
Place of death missing
Cleveland Buckeyes players
Baltimore Elite Giants players
Baseball players from Mississippi
United States Army personnel of World War II
African Americans in World War II
Baseball pitchers
21st-century African-American people
African-American United States Army personnel